Kåfjord or Kåfjorden may refer to these places in Norway:

Finnmark county
 Kåfjord, Alta, a village in Alta municipality
 Kåfjorden (Alta), a fjord in Alta municipality
 Kåfjord Church (Finnmark), a church in Alta municipality
 Kåfjord, Nordkapp, a village in Nordkapp municipality
 Kåfjorden (Nordkapp), a fjord in Nordkapp municipality

Troms county
 Gáivuotna – Kåfjord – Kaivuono, a municipality in Troms county
 Kåfjorden (Troms), a fjord in Gáivuotna – Kåfjord – Kaivuono municipality
 Kåfjord Church, a church in Gáivuotna – Kåfjord – Kaivuono municipality

Vest-Agder county
 Kåfjorden, Vest-Agder (or Kvåfjord), a village in Lindesnes municipality
 Kåfjorden (Vest-Agder) (or Kvåfjorden), a fjord in Lindesnes municipality